Una película de huevos (A Spanish title meaning either A Movie about Eggs or "a movie about balls" [courage]) is a 2006 Mexican animated adventure comedy film produced by Huevocartoon Producciones and distributed by Videocine, and is the first feature film developed by the brand. It is directed by Rodolfo Riva Palacio and Gabriel Riva Palacio and features voices of Bruno Bichir, Angélica Vale and Carlos Espejel.

The film was released on April 21, 2006, and became a commercial success, grossing $142.3 million pesos ($7.6 million), and holds the record as the 10th highest-grossing films produced in Mexico of all time. It won the Ariel Award of 2007 for 'Mejor largometraje de animación' ('Best Animated Feature Film'). The success of the film spawned into a film franchise.

Plot
The birth of a small egg named Toto. His mother longs for Toto to be a great chicken so she loves him very much. It is all a beautiful event until Toto is separated from his mother due to the trading of eggs and is laid with other eggs to be delivered to a supermarket.

In that, he is bought by a woman who feeds her entire family with eggs. In what ends up in the egg cup; he meets Willy, a lookout soldier lookin egg who tries to flee the kitchen with other eggs. As Toto is the newcomer, Willy tells him that the family breakfast is a torture site for the eggs, so a collective escape between the eggs is planned. Toto then met a chocolate egg from underneath the couch. After a brief organization, all the eggs flee except for Toto and Willy, who were captured by the family's pet cat trying to devour them, but fails due to making debris inside the house and eating the eggs punished by its owner.

The next morning, Toto maintains his dream of not being someone's breakfast and becoming a chicken and goes, according to him, to the farm where he was born at, but Willy doesn't want Toto to leave him alone and he invents a lie about how to get to the "Granjas: El Pollón", where the best chickens are raised. Toto agrees to let Willy follow him, but a man shows up for a juice and realizes that there are no eggs and throws a blister of bacon from which a strip of bacon named Tacino comes out stunned, and the man leaves and the eggs and bacon together they begin their great "adventure". First, they travel the entire city in a lunch box to end up rolling through the streets and finally ending up in a sewer and escaping from Tlacua and Cuache, two unfortunate rats who are just looking for something to eat.

After fleeing the opossums and escaping the sewers, Toto, Willy, and Tocino arrive at a fair where they stay to watch Bibi, the acrobat egg, and Willy falls in love with her at first sight. Meanwhile, Toto's mother and two of her friends arrive at a farm where they meet some chickens that speak another "language" (possibly Gallinés-Chinés) and one of her friends who went on a cultural exchange. He asks them about Toto, but the answer was negative and they tell him that the eggs that escape from the city end up in exactly "El Pollon" Farms and the three of them leave. Meanwhile, the 2 eggs and bacon enter through a pipeline which takes them to the reptile farm, where a crocodile has them imprisoned with his henchmen and kids, but they are rescued by Bibi and her 2 brothers who take him to the site of the confetti eggs, where their leader Confi agrees to let them stay for the night. In the middle of the party, after talking to Bibi, Willy tells Toto the whole truth: he doesn't know how to get to the "Farms: El Pollón". Toto gets very angry, insults him, and leaves the fair indignant and Tocino follows him and despite not speaking he tries to convince him to stay, whereby Toto insults Tocino and leaves. As Toto leaves the fair, the reptile eggs enter the confetti egg party and capture Willy, Bibi, and her siblings, but not Tocino and Toto. Realizing the situation of his friends, Tocino goes to look for Toto.

The next day, Tocino finally finds Toto who is about to go to the "El Pollón" Farms in a truck, and using signs, he tells him that Willy and the others are in danger, at first, Toto does not tell him. He makes a big deal out of it, but then thinks about a situation where Willy saved him from being crushed by a car in town, so he accompanies Tocino to the fair. Suddenly, they see that Willy and Bibi are going to be "run over" on the roller coaster track, while Bebe and Bubi are going to be eaten by Coco's father. They free Bebe and Bubi, but he is prevented by the reptile eggs, but then, Confi shows up with the Leader Egg and the eggs that were released thanks to Toto and Willy, so a pitched war breaks out between Toto and Willy's friends against the reptile eggs.

In the end, the reptilian eggs make peace with the others, Serp is caught by Confi and Coco decides to confront him and throws him so hard that he is lost in the sky.

Meanwhile, Willy decides to take Toto to fulfill his dream of being a chicken along with Tocino. First, Willy catches and tames a pigeon and tells Toto to come up, and the latter says goodbye to his friends before leaving. When they arrive at the farms, he meets with his mother (who came to the farms to look for her son), and Willy says goodbye together with Tocino and they both leave.

After a while, Toto turned into a chicken and everyone throws a big party in honor of Toto, along with Willy, Tocino, Bibi, Coco, and his friends.

Before the credits, Tlacua and Cuache appear talking about their misfortune of not being able to eat, but it is when Serp appears falling from the sky (after being thrown by Coco) so Tlacua and Cuache chase him to eat him.

In the post-credit scene, the snapping turtle egg arrives late and finds that all the reptile eggs were gone.

Cast
Bruno Bichir as Toto, a three-day-old chicken egg who got taken away from his mother. He is sometimes stubborn, but also very gentle and caring. He has feathers for hair.
Carlos Espejel as Willy, a four-day-old chicken egg and Sargent of Leader's army, who served as look-out in the egg container before tagging along with Toto and Tocino. He originally wants to become a rooster like Toto, until he meets Bibi and decides to change his course and choose his own road. He wears a green army helmet and a belt.
Angélica Vale as Bibi, a spoiled, circus egg who works at a carnival and is Willy's love interest. Bibi has long, curly brown ponytail and wears a blue cape with star brooches hanging from it. She has two brothers, Bebe and Bubi.
Miguel Guerrero as Tocino, a strip of bacon that Toto and Willy met in the floor of the kitchen. He is found useful weapon due to physical properties such as elasticity and greasiness. Tocino explains through physical movement which can be easily understood by most characters. He doesn't speak throughout the film; however, he does talk in the "bloopers" sequence. He doesn't wear any clothing, but his feet resemble shoes.
Rodolfo Riva Palacio Alatriste as Coco, a crocodile egg and the leader of the reptile gang sent by the adult reptiles to crush the chicken eggs. Despite his leadership, he doesn't really care about the missions given to him by his father and spends most of his time dreaming of becoming a famous actor. He's has big, bulk-like arms tipped with yellowish cuffs and an exaggerated Elvis Presley-style hairdo. Rodolfo also voiced Iguano, an iguana egg and the second-in-command and largest member of the reptile egg gang, whose intelligence is low. He often carries a club and has messy overgrown hair. Among others, Rodolfo also voiced Cuache, an easy-going rat, Poeta Huevo #2 (Egg Poet #2) from the deleted ending scene, and Hue Bond, an egg resembling James Bond who only appears in the bloopers segment.
Gabriel Riva Palacio Alatriste as Confi, a Cascarón egg and the most prominent of the eggs who share the same name. Among his people, he's considered some sort of spiritual guide and is often followed by the others in his senseless prayers and speeches. He operates the night club-like establishment behind the amusement park. Like traditional confetti eggs, he is painted in bright colors and tipped with a piece of navy blue india paper. Gabriel also voices Serp, a rattlesnake egg and a member of Coco's gang. He's very quick tempered, which contrasts starkly with the easygoing nature of the fellow reptile eggs. He's constantly scolding Coco into concentrating on the mission at hand. Due to being a snake egg, he lacks hands and so depends on his surfacing tail to grab objects. Among other characters voiced by Gabriel are Poeta Huevo #3 (Egg Poet #3) who only appears in the deleted ending scene, and Torti, slow tortoise egg who has powerful jaws that Coco's gang commonly use to snap objects apart. He often annoys his fellow gang members due to his slow movements. He's the only quadrupedal egg featured in his gang.
Humberto Vélez as Huevo de chocolate (Chocolate egg) a.k.a. Huevay "El Segundo", a chocolate egg who got lost into the family's sofa for a year. He can be referred as a portrayal of black people, but his behavior suggests he's actually of Cuban race. He wears what resembles to be golden pants.
Blas García as Huevo Líder (Egg Leader) the General of the kitchen's egg army. He's quick to recruit any new eggs into his gang, even when they're not interested. He has bad hearing, which derived on him calling Toto "Pompis". He speaks in a German accent and is the only egg with facial hair. He wears a General army hat.
Enzo Fortuny as Bebe and Mario Filio as Bubi, Bibi's brothers who perform in the same juggling act as her. Despite their childish looks, Bebe and Bubi are very mature and show deep love for their sister. Bebe is a large egg who wears a red body suit with star markings and has a mohawk, while Bubi is a blond egg who wears a blue bodysuit with a star on the chest. Filio also voices Huevito Preso #1 (Egg Prisoner #1).
Gaby Torres as Clara, the Leader's loud subordinate and Willy's superior. She often bosses around with other eggs, but does so out of genuine concern for their safety.
Irwin Daayán as Fefe and Gogo / Vendedor (seller)
Carlos Cobos as Effeminate Egg
Fernando Meza as Tlacua, a hungry and quick-tempered rat / Lagartijo, a neurotic egg who is part of the reptile egg gang / Poeta Huevo #1 (Egg Poet #1)
Rubén Moya as Cocodrilo, the crocodile leader of the adult reptile eggs group and father of Coco. He hopes for his son to be cruel and a bully just like him, but is depressed by the fact that Coco cares more about acting. Cocodrilo has a military-like hairdo.
Lourdes Morán as Mamá Gallina, Toto's sweet and caring mother hen, who is also brave who decided to leave her barn to find her son that's been taken away from her. She wears a blue handkerchief around her neck.

Release
The film was released in theaters in Mexico on 21 April 2006. The film, along with its successor, were released on DVD in the United States as a "2-Pack". However, neither film received in a major U.S. release due to their "racist" and "violent" nature, which failed to comply with the American humor code within the industry and the 2 films have no English subtitles or dubs.

Sequels

The success of the film has spawned into a series of films. The first sequel, Otra Película de Huevos y un Pollo was released in 2009, and the second sequel, Un gallo con muchos huevos, was released in 2015, both of which also became box office successes.

A fourth installment, titled Un rescate de huevitos, was released on August 12, 2021. Followed by a fifth and final installment, titled Huevitos congelados, set for release in 2022. Both films will be computer-animated.

Videogame
A video game based on the film was released on 19 April 2010, named Un Juego de Huevos. It was designed and released exclusively for the Zeebo system, a 3G wireless-enabled entertainment and education platform from Zeebo Inc. currently available in Mexico and Brazil.

See also
Otra Película de Huevos y un Pollo
Un gallo con muchos huevos
Marcianos vs. Mexicanos

References

External links
 Official site
 
 

2006 films
2006 comedy films
2006 fantasy films
2006 animated films
2000s Mexican films
2000s children's adventure films
2000s children's comedy films
2000s children's fantasy films
2000s children's animated films
2000s adventure comedy films
2000s fantasy comedy films
2000s survival films
2000s Spanish-language films
Mexican animated films
Mexican children's films
Mexican adventure comedy films
Mexican fantasy comedy films
Mexican survival films
Animated adventure films
Animated comedy films
Animated fantasy films
Animated films about chickens
Films about food and drink
Films set in Mexico
Films set on farms
Films set in 2006
Eggs in culture